Aaron Maté is a Canadian writer and journalist. He hosts the show Pushback with Aaron Maté on The Grayzone and, as of January 2022, he fills in as a host on the Useful Idiots podcast.

Maté works as a reporter for The Grayzone, a far-left blog  In addition to his work for The Grayzone, Maté has also contributed to The Nation, and appeared several times on Fox News on Tucker Carlson Tonight.

He challenged allegations of collusion between the Russian Government and the 2016 Trump Campaign, and the extent to which Russian interference influenced the outcome of the 2016 US presidential election. 

Maté promotes conspiracy theories about the 7 April 2018 Douma chemical attacks, in which the Syrian government carried out chemical weapons attacks against civilians in the city of Douma. Maté specifically attempts to cast doubt on the Syrian government's responsibility for the attacks, and has promoted his theories at two UN meetings hosted by the Russian Federation. With regard to Maté's reporting on the Syrian Civil War, the Institute for Strategic Dialogue stated that, among the 28 social media accounts, individuals, outlets and organisations which it studied, Maté was the most prolific spreader of disinformation  on topics related to the war, including use of chemical weapons.

Early life 
Maté was born in Vancouver to Rae Maté, a visual artist and an illustrator of children's books, and Gabor Maté, a Hungarian physician, author, and columnist.

While a student, Maté was vice president of the pro-Palestinian student union at Concordia University in Montreal, Quebec, Canada and he was the main subject of the National Film Board of Canada documentary Discordia. The film depicts Maté's campus activism in support of the Palestinian cause and the effect it has on his relationship with the student union and his Palestinian friends. He received death threats from fellow Jews due to his condemnation of Israel's treatment of Palestinians. Maté was arrested during the Concordia University Netanyahu riot on 9 September 2002, after stepping between protesters and police, for which he faced expulsion.

From 2003 to 2005 Maté worked as a primary researcher for Naomi Klein, who praised him as "a great intellect and terrific journalist".

Journalism 
Up to 2017, Maté had worked as a reporter and producer for Democracy Now!, Vice, The Real News Network, and Al Jazeera. Maté earned an Izzy Award in April 2019 for this work.

Scepticism of Special Counsel Investigation and Russia's role in election interference 
Using the term "Russiagate", Maté covered the story around Russian interference in the 2016 United States elections and criticized the mainstream media coverage of the Special Counsel investigation. 

In October 2017, Maté discussed the media coverage of the investigation in The Nation, stating that "unverified claims are reported with little to no scepticism ... developments are cherry-picked and overhyped, while countervailing ones are minimised or ignored. Front-page headlines advertise explosive and incriminating developments, only to often be undermined by the article's content, or retracted entirely." Maté said use of social media by Russia had no effect on the election: "To suggest 200 [Twitter] accounts out of 328 million could have had an impact is as much an insult to common sense as it is to basic math". "A $100,000 Facebook ad purchase seems unlikely to have had much impact in a $6.8 billion election". In a July 2018 article in The Nation following the 2018 Russia–United States summit in Helsinki between President Donald Trump and Russian President Vladimir Putin, he defended Trump against the statements made against him, such as the claim the summit had triggered an American "national security crisis". In May 2017, Bob Cesca wrote on the Salon website: "Both Maté and [Zack] Beauchamp go to great lengths to characterize speculation about the Trump-Russia connection, which I would describe as small-C conspiracy theories, as being on a similar level as Alex Jones' loony big-C conspiracy mongering."

In December 2017, Maté interviewed Luke Harding on The Real News Network about Harding's just published book about the Russian interference to help Trump, Collusion: Secret Meetings, Dirty Money, and How Russia Helped Donald Trump Win. Vanity Fair described Maté as "a polite but dogged skeptic who administered a memorable vivisection" to Harding during the interview.

Maté earned an Izzy Award in April 2019 for his work "taking a factual, meticulous approach to the overhyped, over-exaggerated Russia election-collusion story" and for challenging press coverage of Robert Mueller's Special Counsel investigation.

In November 2019, Maté suggested John Brennan, former director of the CIA, had suspicious reasons for the investigation into Russian links in a November 2019 article for Real Clear Investigations.

In December 2019, Maté appeared on Tucker Carlson's Fox News show and said that people "are accepting the claim that Russia hacked the DNC, even though there's been no evidence yet". Carlson pushed back against Maté's assesment, who then said that there have been "claims" from "discredited intelligence officials". After numerous investigations into the 2016 election interference, U.S. intelligence agencies reported with "high confidence" that Russia was the culprit in the DNC cyberattacks.

In May 2020, Maté stated: "All of the available evidence showed just how baseless [Russiagate] was". He said those who resisted Trump's administration were distracted by the "conspiracy theory that he conspired with or was blackmailed by Russia".

Syria, Douma, and the Organisation for the Prohibition of Chemical Weapons 
Independent international investigations have concluded that the Syrian government of Bashar al-Assad has used chemical weapons against civilians at least five times during the Syrian Civil War, including in the 7 April 2018 Douma chemical attacks. Nevertheless, Maté has attempted to cast doubt on the Syrian government's responsibility for the Douma attacks. He has been featured at multiple United Nations meetings hosted by the Russian government in order to publicize conspiracy theories about the Douma attacks. 

Maté's claims regarding Douma are based on private correspondence between two former Organisation for the Prohibition of Chemical Weapons (OPCW) inspectors, in which they called into question an OPCW report implicating the Syrian government for the Douma attacks. This correspondence was released by Wikileaks and publicized by pro-Russia sources. An article by Bellingcat indicated that the skepticism of one of inspectors was rooted in technical ignorance; the investigator had left his position with the OPCW before the period when it carried out most of its investigative work on Douma, and was simply ignorant of the new technology the OPCW used to corroborate the allegation of a chemical weapons attack.

In September 2020, Maté testified at the United Nations at an Arria meeting hosted by the Russian Federation and China, about the alleged cover-up by the OPCW. In April 2021, he spoke at another Russian-hosted UN event on the topic.

In May 2021, he accompanied Paul Larudee and other members of the Syria Solidarity Movement to observe the 2021 Syrian presidential election.

Maté and The Grayzone, for which he reports, have been recipients of the Association for Investment in Popular Action Committees's Serena Shim Award. According to Brian Whitaker writing in NewLines magazine, some of the previous winners of the award have advocated conspiracy theories and many have supported the Syrian government.

In June 2022, the Institute for Strategic Dialogue (ISD) published an analysis of social media accounts, individuals, outlets and organisations who disseminated disinformation about the Syrian conflict. Maté was named as the most prolific spreader of disinformation about the Syrian conflict since 2020 among the 28 conspiracy theorists analysed. In a footnote added the following month to the London Observer article about the ISD report, Maté was quoted as saying "neither the study or the Observer offer any evidence" for the assertion he is a spreader of disinformation and that the Institute for Strategic Dialogue "does not even attempt to refute a single claim of mine". Maté also alleged a conflict of interest  because the ISD’s funders included some western governments involved in the Syrian conflict.

Other journalism and commentary 
In November 2020, Maté said that the appointment of Antony Blinken as Secretary of State and the possible nomination of Michèle Flournoy as Defense Secretary, showed that President-elect Joe Biden was "continuing with the hawkish playbook" he had followed throughout his career.

In February 2021, Maté was the first to report that Amnesty International had removed Russian opposition politician Alexei Navalny's status as a prisoner of conscience "given the fact that he advocated violence and discrimination and has not yet retracted such statements". Oliver Carroll wrote in The Independent that The Grayzone had "amplified" criticism of Navalny and "appears to have been privy to lobbying around the Amnesty decision".

Maté was critical of President Biden's response to Israel's attack on Gaza in May 2021. Maté said Biden's telephone call to Israeli Prime Minister Benjamin Netanyahu, in which Biden expressed his "unwavering support" for Israel's "right to defend itself", was "a green light for Netanyahu to continue massacring Palestinian civilians".

Katrina vanden Heuvel wrote that the US had "tentatively been opening the door to negotiations" with Russia during its 2022 invasion of Ukraine and Maté has "carefully detailed" the way in which the Biden administration "had orchestrated leaks to the media".

Maté said that the Ukrainian Government, which came to power after the Maidan revolution, was a "fascist-infused coup". Regarding the 2022 Russian invasion of Ukraine, he said that the US was funding "proxy warfare" against Russia and preventing any prospect of peace for its own ends.

In February 2023, The Bulwark website published an article by Cathy Young in which she accused Maté of sharing a deceptively cut video of an interview by Israel's ex-PM, Naftali Bennett, in which he talked about the break down in peace negotiations during the Russian invasion of Ukraine. According to Maté, Bennett said that Russia and Ukraine reached a preliminary peace agreement early in the war but the US rejected it. According to Young, Bennett said the peace talks stalled after the Bucha massacre.

The Canadian University of Calgary's School of Public Policy published a list of "Russian-influenced" social media accounts, which included Maté.

Personal life
Maté's mother is Rae Maté, a visual artist and illustrator of children's books, and his father is physician and author, Gabor Maté. Maté is Jewish.

References

External links 

 Aaron Maté in The Nation
 Aaron Maté on Substack

Year of birth missing (living people)
Living people
Canadian magazine journalists
Canadian people of Hungarian-Jewish descent
Concordia University alumni
Journalists from British Columbia
Canadian expatriates in the United States